Corruption is an issue in  Ukrainian society often tied to a troubled relationship with Russia  going back to the fall of the Soviet Union in
1991.  Since regaining independence from Russia, Ukraine has faced a series of politicians, criminal bosses, and oligarchs who used the corruption of police, political parties, and industry to gain power. Eventual public outcry towards corruption lead to the Euromaidan uprising.

History 
Following post-Soviet Union independence Ukraine faced the greatest and most violent corruption in areas of Donbas which had with  materials, industry, tourism, and ports.  Roots of the Ukrainian corruption stem from the Soviet nature of the Ukrainian political leaders, who used to be integrated into the Communist  (ruling elite) before the collapse of the Soviet Union. In 2005 mass graves from  the 1990s with businesspersons, judges, lawyers, investigators were discovered in Donetsk. 

United States diplomats described Ukraine under Presidents Kuchma (in office from 1994 to 2005) and Yushchenko (in office from 2005 to 2010) as a kleptocracy, according to United States diplomatic cables. Former Governor of Donetsk and impeached President Viktor Yanukovych had known ties to organized crime as part of his political base the Party of Regions.

In 2014 the Euromaidan Uprising which broke out after Viktor Yanukovych refused to sign a trade deal with European Union lead to widespread protests over corruption. As protesters gathered Ukraine Special Force, assaulted protesters leading to a Protest of
the existing power at a National level.

Corruption reforms have seen some successes in Ukraine has since the Revolution of Dignity. Police reform, public procurement, and dissolution of state owned industries since 2014 have led to reduced waste and corruption.

In January 2023, several senior officials, including five provincial governors, lost their jobs in a corruption scandal during the Russian invasion of Ukraine. Deputy Defense Minister Viacheslav Shapovalov, following a major procurement scandal in the ministry, and deputy head of the Office of the President of Ukraine Kyrylo Tymoshenko also resigned at the same time. A few days earlier a deputy minister at the Ministry of Infrastructure was sacked after the anti-corruption agency detained him while he was receiving a $400,000 alleged bribe.

Comparative Research on Corruption 

In an August 1995 survey by the Ilko Kucheriv Democratic Initiatives Foundation, 41.8% of respondents stated that corruption "is a shameful phenomenon that has no objective grounds" while 36% choose the option that corruption is "a component of social traditions." Respondents from Southern and Western Ukraine more often chose the option of corruption being "a component of social traditions" (42.2% and 43.4%). The option "a shameful phenomenon that has no objective grounds" was more often chosen by respondents in Central Ukraine (47.5%) and Eastern Ukraine (53.45%).

In 2012 Ernst & Young put Ukraine among the three most-corrupt nations from 43 surveyed, alongside Colombia and Brazil. In 2015 The Guardian called Ukraine "the most corrupt nation in Europe". According to a poll conducted by Ernst & Young in 2017, experts considered Ukraine to be the ninth-most corrupt nation from 53 surveyed. According to Transparency International's 2021 Corruption Perceptions Index, (a scale of least to most corrupt nations), Ukraine ranked 122nd out of 180 countries in 2021, the second most corrupt in Europe, with Russia the most at 136.

According to Transparency International's 2021 Corruption Perceptions Index, (a scale of least to most corrupt nations), Ukraine ranked 122nd out of 180 countries in 2021, the second most corrupt in Europe, with Russia the most at 136.

Prominent Ukrainian economist  performed a comparison of the Ukrainian corruption in a wide global context based on data provided by Transparency International. This research estimated the level of the corruption in Ukraine as comparable to countries of Sub-Saharan Africa with Uganda as the closest counterpart.

Types of corruption 
Corruption in Ukraine has followed similar paths or organized crimes and political parties in post Soviet Union.

Bribery 
Bribes are given to ensure that public services are delivered either in time or at all. Ukrainians stated they give bribes because they think it is customary and expected. Some of the biggest bribes involve more than US$1 million. According to a 2008 Management Systems International (MSI) sociological survey, the highest corruption levels were found in vehicle inspection (57.5%), the police (54.2%), health care (54%), the courts (49%) and higher education (43.6%). On 8 June 2011, Ukrainian President Viktor Yanukovych stated that corruption costs the state budget 2.5 billion in revenues annually and that through corrupt dealings in public procurement 10% to 15% (US$7.4 billion) of the state budget "ends up in the pockets of officials".

According to the United States Agency for International Development (USAID), the main causes of corruption in Ukraine are a compromised justice system and an over-controlling non-transparent government combined with business-political ties to Russia and a weakened civil society. Corruption is regularly discussed in the Ukrainian media.

In May 2016, the IMF mission chief for Ukraine stated that the reduction of corruption was a key test for continued international support. Some western analysts believe that large foreign loans are not encouraging reform, but enabling the corrupt extraction of funds out of the country. U.S. Assistant Secretary of State Victoria Nuland urged Ukraine to start prosecuting corrupt officials: "It's time to start locking up people who have ripped off the Ukrainian population for too long and it is time to eradicate the cancer of corruption".

Bribery targets included the police, health service and  education system. Through repeated surveys from 2000-2010, a majority of  Ukrainians self-reported corrupt transactions with the Government.  

In 2008, 21% responded that they or anyone living in their household had paid a bribe in any form in the previous 12 months. In a GfK survey held in the summer of 2001 43% stated they never personally had given bribes.

Political corruption

In the years after Ukrainian independence, election fraud was widespread, mainly through the use of "administrative resources". On the other hand, according to Taras Kuzio election fraud in Ukraine can only reach five percent of the total vote. Following the initial rounds of voting in the 2004 presidential election, the Supreme Court of Ukraine ruled that due to the scale of the electoral fraud, it was impossible to establish the election results and ordered a revote. Afterwards outright vote rigging diminished, although politicians still claim(ed) election fraud, and administrative tricks to get more votes for a particular party have not vanished. The Ukrainian electorate remains highly skeptical about the honesty of the election process. Any voter who engages in election fraud faces a maximum sentence of two years in jail, though activists say no one has been punished for voter fraud since Ukrainian independence.

United States diplomats have claimed the privatization of several Ukrainian state enterprises were rigged in favor of political friends. On a regional level, corruption has been discovered in connection with land allocation.

Ukrainian politicians have regularly accused each other of corruption while claiming to fight it themselves. After going undercover in the  Reforms for the Future parliamentary faction in early 2012, Roman Zabzalyuk claimed this faction "bought" its members for "500,000 (for a 'defection' from other parliamentary groups), and then they pay a monthly salary of $20,000-25,000"; in contrast, according to Reforms for the Future, Zabzalyuk had pretended he was "suffering a very serious disease" and the group had managed to raise some $100,000 for Zabzalyuk to undergo surgery in Israel.

Since July 1, 2011, the President, Chairman of the Verkhovna Rada, Prime Minister, Prosecutor General, ministers and other Ukrainian top officials have been liable for prosecution for corruption. Since 2010 the Ukrainian press brought up thousands of examples of criminal cases in which state officials, as well as politicians and businessmen linked to the ruling Party of Regions, were shown leniency unprecedented for the general population of suspects.

Minister of Internal Affairs Vitaliy Zakharchenko stated in March 2012 that since 2010 about 400 politicians had faced criminal charges in connection with corruption; most of them from the Party of Regions, followed by Bloc Yulia Tymoshenko and Our Ukraine–People's Self-Defense Bloc members. It is unclear how many of those charges have since been proved by the courts.

Ukrainian media, particularly the Ukrayinska Pravda, regularly unveil a millionaire lifestyle of Ukrainian politicians and public servants, utterly at odds with their declared official incomes.

According to historian Andrew Wilson, as of 2016 progress in reducing corruption was poor. A 2015 survey showed that 72% of adults blamed "corruption of power" for the lack of progress in reform.

An October 2016 requirement for MPs to declare their wealth led to a declared cumulative wealth of about $460 million for the 413 MPs. Reacting to public criticism, MPs cancelled a salary rise that would have doubled their monthly salary. This measure was part of an Anti-Corruption Package passed into law in October 2014, which was a requirement of international financial support for Ukraine and a prerequisite to eligibility for visa-free travel within the European Union.

Local politics
Several Ukrainian mayors have been suspected of using their posts to serve their own business interests.

Serhiy Odarych, former mayor of Cherkasy, has been suspected of causing a ₴600,000 loss to the city budget.

Judicial corruption
Ukrainian politicians and analysts have described the system of justice in Ukraine as "rotten to the core" and have complained about political pressure put on judges and corruption. Independent lawyers and human rights activists have complained Ukrainian judges regularly come under pressure to hand down a certain verdict. Ukraine's court system is widely regarded as corrupt. A Ukrainian Justice Ministry survey in 2009 revealed that only 10% of respondents trusted the nation's court system. Less than 30% believed that it was still possible to get a fair trial.

Although judicial independence exists in principle, in practice there is little separation of juridical and political powers. Judges are subjected to pressure by political and business interests.

A 2017 Reuters article quotes then-PM Volodomyr Groysman, saying that "the weakest link in our fight against corruption is the Ukrainian court"; giving an example of 30 judges "with annual salaries ranging from US$10,000-13,000" who own Porsches. As another example, on May 22, 2012, Volodymyr Rokytskyi, Deputy Head of Ukraine's Security Service, was photographed in public wearing a 32,000 luxury wristwatch—despite the fact that its price amounts to his yearly official income—at a joint Ukrainian-American event dedicated to fighting illegal drugs. Ukrainian judges have been arrested while taking bribes.

Critics have also complained that officials and their children (the latter are known as "mazhory") receive favourable sentences compared with common citizens.

Kyiv Post reported in November 2018 that several candidates for a post in the new High Anti-Corruption Court of Ukraine were themselves suspected/associated with corruption. AutoMaidan, Dejure and Anti-corruption Action Center criticised the Ethics Council's June 2022 decisions in nominations to and exclusions from the Supreme Council of Justice as including judges tainted in relation to corruption and as unfairly excluding the anti-corruption whistleblower judge Larysa Golnyk.

Corruption in the public sector
In 2015 corruption allegations were made against Energoatom, Ukraine's state nuclear power operator. In March 2016, Energoatom's assets and bank accounts were frozen by Ukrainian courts over allegedly unpaid debts, against which Energoatom is appealing.

As of 2016, many of Ukraine's major provincial highways are in very poor condition, with an Ukravtodor official stating that 97% of roads are in need of repair.  The road repair budget was set at about ₴20 billion, but corruption causes the budget to be poorly spent.

Corruption in higher education
Higher education in Ukraine is plagued with bribery. In 2011 33% of all students claimed they have encountered corruption in their school, 29% heard about cases of corruption from other students, while 38% had not encountered corruption. According to Transparency International research done in 2008, 47.3% of university students stated that a bribe had been demanded from them; of those, 29% had paid this bribe freely. Students can "buy" a college entry, exam results, marking doctoral and/or master's theses.

Bribes range from US$10 to US$50 for an exam pass to several thousand for entry to a university. According to government sources, bribes vary from US$80 to US$21,500. Salaries of teachers and professors are low in Ukraine compared with other professions; this may cause them to be tempted to demand bribes. According to Ararat Osipian entire corruption hierarchies have formed in Ukraine's colleges and universities. These hierarchies have evolved since the 1990s as the result of uncontrolled and rampant corruption. Ararat claims that corrupt ruling regimes control corrupt universities and force them into compliance, including during the elections. This was aided by universities largely remain Stalinist type bureaucracies, unable to transform.

Until 2015 university autonomy was nonexistent. In 2015 the Ukrainian parliament passed a new law on higher education to give universities more autonomy, including control over their own finances. The aim was to encourage private investment, fundraising and the creation of endowments.

Ukrainian government officials have been caught with fake university diplomas.

Corruption in the social security system
In 2012 President Viktor Yanukovych reported that only about 23 percent of social service funds go to those who actually need it. The Ukrainian media have featured many stories revealing that even parliamentarians illegally receive social benefits, fraudulently claiming to be war and Chernobyl veterans.

Corruption in healthcare
Though medical care in state-run hospitals is theoretically free for Ukrainians, patients' paying money there to ensure they receive the treatment required is widespread. In June 2012 advocacy groups accused Health Ministry officials of embezzling money that should be used to treat AIDS patients by buying AIDS drugs at hugely inflated prices and then receiving kickbacks.

Corruption and business
In 2011 the Organisation for Economic Co-operation and Development stated corruption is a "significant obstacle" to doing business in Ukraine.

Research conducted by Ernst & Young in 2011 and 2012 showed that the practice of top managers accepting bribes increased by 9 percent in 2011 and 15 percent in 2012. Another 4 percent were ready to pay bribes in order to hide the details of their financial performance.

In 2016, politician Natalia Korolevska has estimated that "Corruption has forced business to go in the shadow where now we have 45% of our economy".

The representative of one United Kingdom-based company has claimed non-Ukrainian companies often lose contracts if they will not pay bribes or fail to "out-bribe" their competitors. Ukrainians and business representatives have claimed "Business ventures above a certain level require palm-greasing of some functionary at some level".

Costs of corruption

According to Ararat Osipian due to endemic corruption, Ukraine failed to sustain its economic growth trends. The corruption, perceived as reckless, that marked President Viktor Yanukovich's rule contributed to his downfall in 2014 and left the country's army ill-equipped to counter Russia's invasion of Crimea.

In 2008 Transparency International estimated that 30 to 50 percent of all Ukrainians had faced government corruption. Juhani Grossmann (working for an a.o. Management Systems International project) claimed in 2009 that "Ukrainians pay roughly ₴3.5 billion, or more than US$400 million, in bribes annually."  The previous year, he claimed that the figure was US$700 million.

Anti-corruption efforts 

After his election in late 2004 President Viktor Yushchenko promised a "War on Corruption". Several officials were indeed arrested and/or questioned early 2005 (among them later ministers in the Azarov Government Borys Kolesnikov and Yuri Boyko). Former Security Service of Ukraine Chairman Oleksandr Turchynov claimed that in the summer of 2005 Yushchenko prevented an investigation into allegedly fraudulent practices in the transport of Turkmen natural gas to Ukraine and prevented the arrest of Boyko for abuse of office while heading Naftogaz:

In a 20 September 2005 interview with Radio Free Europe/Radio Liberty, "Turchynov stated that Yushchenko told him in mid-August to stop 'persecuting my men' and that the investigation of RosUkrEnergo was 'creating a conflict with Russian President Vladimir Putin'". A survey conducted in November 2008 showed that 73% of people in Ukraine considered the second Tymoshenko Government's actions against corruption to be ineffective; comparable figures for the U.S. and the UK were 73% and 39%. In a survey in 2001, when Kuchma was president, 80% of Ukrainians "totally/fairly agreed" with the statement: "The present government has no real interest in punishing corruption".

Ukraine joined the Group of States Against Corruption in 2006.

Over the years, several anti-corruption laws have been passed by the Ukrainian parliament. In September 2011 the National Anti-Corruption Committee was introduced.

Like his predecessor Yushchenko, President Viktor Yanukovych (and his Azarov Government) made the fight against corruption a spearhead in his domestic policies. Political opponents of Yanukovych accused him of using his anti-corruption campaign for politically motivated trials; the general public in Ukraine largely shared this view. President Yanukovych denied this.

The International Association of Anti-Corruption Authorities spoke in April 2011 of "remarkable successes in fighting corruption in 2010". The EU Ambassador to Ukraine, Jose Manuel Pinto Teixeira, stated at an investment conference on February 28, 2012, that Yanukovych's pledges of reform "have regrettably produced no such results."

In May 2014, an Anti-Corruption Initiative was established. In December, it appointed Lithuanian economist and former European Commissioner for Taxation and Customs Union, Audit and Anti-Fraud Algirdas Šemeta as Business Ombudsman.

The National Anti-Corruption Bureau of Ukraine (NABU), for carrying out investigations of corruption, was established in June 2014 after its predecessor, the National Anti-Corruption Committee was considered a failure. For designing and implementing systematic change tending to prevent corruption, the National Agency for Prevention of Corruption was created in 2015.

In 2015, President Petro Poroshenko sacked Ihor Kolomoisky — the billionaire governor of the key industrial region of Dnipropetrovsk. It came after armed men suspected of links to Kolomoisky briefly occupied the offices of a state-owned oil firm in the capital Kyiv.

On 14 June 2018, a law came into force requiring that cases concerning corruption be brought directly to the High Anti-Corruption Court of Ukraine. In June 2018 President Poroshenko expected the court to be established before the end of 2018. On 5 September 2019 the High Anti-Corruption Court did start to work.

Due to IMF concern that oligarchs would use the courts to seize bailout money, parliament passed a bill on 13 May 2020 to prevent courts from reversing bank nationalizations. The bill would combat a lawsuit by oligarch Ihor Kolomoisky and others seeking to regain control of PrivatBank, the recipient of a $5.5 billion 2016 bailout and an alleged "money laundering machine" under Kolomoisky.

On 27 October 2020, the Constitutional Court of Ukraine ruled that anti-corruption legislation, including the mandatory electronic declaration of income, was unconstitutional. President Zelensky warned that if parliament did not restore these anti-corruption laws, foreign aid, loans and a visa-free travel to the European Union were at risk. The Governor of the National Bank of Ukraine reported that Ukraine would not receive the scheduled $700 million IMF load before the end of 2020 because of the issue. IMF assessment teams had not visited Kyiv for eight months. A visit was necessary for further IMF loan tranches to be released.

On 4 December 2020, the Ukrainian parliament restored anti-corruption legislation shut down by the court decision, when it reauthorised criminal penalties for officials who provide false information about their incomes. On 29 December 2020 President Volodymyr Zelensky suspended the Constitutional Court's chairperson Oleksandr Tupytskyi for two months in an effort to overturn the court's October 2020 decision.

On 19 July 2022, a commission created for selecting a new head of the Specialized Anti-Corruption Prosecutor's Office (SAPO, which oversees NABU) via an open competition procedure announced Oleksandr Klymenko as the winner of the competition, out of 37 candidates.

Public Perception 
According to Ukrainians the most corrupt are the judiciary, the police, public servants, the health service and parliament.

Corruption Perceptions Index ratings

Transparency International produces an annual report listing each country's Corruption Perceptions Index score.  This "score relates to perceptions of the degree of corruption as seen by business people and country analysts and, through 2011, ranged between 10 (highly clean) and 0 (highly corrupt)." In the 2010 report, the least corrupt country listed was Denmark with a score of 9.3, and the most corrupt of the 178 countries listed was Somalia with a score of 1.1.  From 2012 on, the scores were presented on a 0-100 scale. In the 2016 report, Denmark was still the least corrupt country listed with a score of 90, and Somalia was still the most corrupt of the 176 countries listed, with a score of 10.  By comparison, Germany, Luxembourg and the United Kingdom tied as 10th least corrupt countries with a score of 81, and the United States was 18th least corrupt with a score of 74.

The following table lists Ukraine's place in the Corruption Perceptions Index table, based on Transparency International's annual reports from 1999 onward. The methods used in assessing the Index change from year to year, so comparisons between years are difficult.

In 2014's Transparency International Corruption Perceptions Index Ukraine was ranked 142nd out of the 175 countries investigated (tied with Uganda and the Comoros).
Note: For 1999 and 2000, the data were listed as 1998 and 1999 respectively.  From 2001, the data listed are stated to be for the year of the annual report.  Up to 2005, the annual report included some measures of the uncertainty of the index scores; these data were omitted from the annual reports from 2006 onwards, but were contained in the CPI report.

Public Perception of Corruption in Institutions of Ukraine
The following table shows average scores from a survey of Ukrainian public perception of corruption in Ukraine's institutions. Comparable figures for the United Kingdom and the United States from surveys for 2009 (for British and American people's perception of corruption in their own countries) are shown at the bottom of the table.

See also 
 
 Larysa Golnyk – Ukrainian anti-corruption whistleblower judge

References

External links
Ukraine Corruption Profile from the Risk & Compliance Portal (formerly the Business Anti-Corruption Portal)
 Ukraine: State of Chaos 
Ukraine corruption law 'not enough', Today (July 6, 2011)

 
Politics of Ukraine
Economy of Ukraine
Ukraine
Ukraine